The 1988 Victorian state election was held on 1 October 1988.

Seat changes
A number of members contested different seats:
Thomastown Labor MLC Jim Kennan contested the lower house seat of Broadmeadows.
Melbourne West Labor MLC Joan Kirner contested the lower house seat of Williamstown.
Gippsland Labor MLC Barry Murphy contested the lower house seat of Morwell as an independent.
Chelsea Labor MLC Mal Sandon contested the lower house seat of Carrum.

Retiring Members

Labor
Valerie Callister MLA (Morwell)
Ian Cathie MLA (Carrum)
Tom Edmunds MLA (Pascoe Vale)
Bill Fogarty MLA (Sunshine)
Gordon Hockley MLA (Bentleigh)
Carl Kirkwood MLA (Preston)
Keith Remington MLA (Melbourne)
Theo Sidiropoulos MLA (Richmond)
Jack Simpson MLA (Niddrie)
Gordon Stirling MLA (Williamstown)
Frank Wilkes MLA (Northcote)

Liberal
Digby Crozier MLA (Portland)
Jim Ramsay MLA (Balwyn)
Morris Williams MLA (Doncaster)
Jock Granter MLC (Central Highlands)
Bruce Reid MLC (Bendigo)
Roy Ward MLC (South Eastern)

National
Milton Whiting MLA (Mildura)
Bernie Dunn MLC (North Western)

Legislative Assembly
Sitting members are shown in bold text. Successful candidates are highlighted in the relevant colour. Where there is possible confusion, an asterisk (*) is also used.

Legislative Council
Sitting members are shown in bold text. Successful candidates are highlighted in the relevant colour. Where there is possible confusion, an asterisk (*) is also used.

References

Psephos - Adam Carr's Election Archive

Victoria
Candidates for Victorian state elections